Anja Müller-Schache (born 29 March 1977) is a German foil fencer. She won a bronze medal, as a member of the German fencing team, at the 2009 World Fencing Championships in Antalya, Turkey.

Schache represented Germany at the 2008 Summer Olympics in Beijing, where she competed in two foil events. For her first event, the women's individual foil, Schache received a bye for the second preliminary round match, before losing out to Russia's Evgenia Lamonova, with a score of 2–15. Few days later, she joined with her fellow fencers and teammates Melanie Wolgast, Katja Wächter, and Carolin Golubytskyi for the women's team foil. Schache and her team, however, lost the fifth place match to the Chinese team (led by Zhang Lei), with a total score of 28 touches.

References

External links
  (archive)
 
 
 
 

German female fencers
Living people
Olympic fencers of Germany
Fencers at the 2008 Summer Olympics
Sportspeople from Potsdam
1977 births